Shannon Smith may refer to:

Sportspeople
Shannon Smith (lacrosse), American lacrosse coach and player
Shannon Smith (marksman), U.S. sport shooter in the USPSA Handgun Championship
Shannon Smith (swimmer), Canadian competition swimmer

Fictional characters
Shannon Smith, fictional character in Mankillers
Shannon Smith, a character played by Stephanie Kaur in the British web series Corner Shop Show

Others
Shannon Smith, gunshot victim whose death led to Shannon's law
Shannon Smith, musician in The Imperials
Shannon M. Smith, maiden name of Shannon M. Kent, U.S. Navy Chief Petty Officer KIA Manbij, Syria 2018

See also
Shannon Smyth, soccer player and coach